Romeo Giovannini (born 28 September 2001) is an Italian professional footballer who plays as a forward for  club Modena.

Club career
In 2019 he joined to Carpi. Giovannini made his professional debut on 27 September 2020 against Sambenedettese for Serie C.

In August 2021, he signed with Modena.

References

External links
 
 

2001 births
Living people
People from Savona
Footballers from Liguria
Italian footballers
Association football forwards
Serie C players
Serie D players
Savona F.B.C. players
A.C. Carpi players
Modena F.C. 2018 players
Sportspeople from the Province of Savona